Mickle Island is a very small island  southeast of Flagstaff Point, close off the west side of Ross Island, Antarctica. It was charted and so named by the British Antarctic Expedition, 1907–09, led by Ernest Shackleton. The name appears to be capricious or whimsical, "mickle" meaning "great."

See also 
 List of antarctic and sub-antarctic islands

References

Islands of the Ross Dependency
Ross Archipelago